There have been three prominent statues of Margaret Thatcher:

Statue of Margaret Thatcher (London Guildhall), 1998
Statue of Margaret Thatcher (Palace of Westminster), 2007
Statue of Margaret Thatcher (Grantham), 2022